Melbourne Weekender is a travel and lifestyle show hosted by Cameron Ling. The weekly, half-hour program was produced by Seven Productions and visited various locations in Melbourne and Victoria, showing destinations and experiences which can be enjoyed on a weekend. 

The show was first screened in 2005 on Saturdays at 5.30pm. It was originally hosted by Peter Mitchell and then Jo Silvagni. The show was produced by Dreampool Productions with a range of presenters who feature stories on gardening, pets, renovating, fishing, boating, dining, entertainment and where to take the family around Melbourne. 

In June 2015, the show returned to air with host Cameron Ling and a team of reporters. A revival in 2019 was titled "The Great Weekend" and was presented by Jane Bunn, Brian Taylor, Jack Riewoldt, Brooke Hogan and Pete Lazer. In November 2019, the Seven Network announced the show had been axed with final episodes screening in early 2020.

Presenters

Current
 Cameron Ling
 Matthew Richardson
 Erica Davis
 Bree Laughlin
 Jade Robran
 Russell Gilbert
Jane Bunn
Cindy Sargon
Kayne Tremills

Past
 Katrina Warren - pets and animals
 Peter Mitchell - entertainment 
 Mel Kotsos - families
 Andrew Laidlaw - gardens
 Arni Sleemen - dining 
 Reuben Buchanan - health and fitness
 Andrew Morley

See also
 Sydney Weekender
 Queensland Weekender
 WA Weekender
 SA Weekender

References

External links
Official site
Seven Network
Dreampool Productions
Dreampool Digital

Seven Network original programming
Australian non-fiction television series
2006 Australian television series debuts
2010s Australian television series
Television shows set in Melbourne
Australian travel television series
Tourism in Melbourne